Nikola Chongarov (born 20 September 1989 in Varna, Bulgaria) is a former alpine, current ski cross skier from Bulgaria. He competed for Bulgaria at the 2014 Winter Olympics in all five alpine skiing events.

Chongarov competed FIS Alpine Ski World Cup between 2009-2014. Since 2016 he competed FIS Freestyle Ski World Cup.

World Cup results

Alpine skiing

Season standings

Results per discipline

Freestyle skiing

Results per discipline

World Championship results

Alpine skiing

World Championship results

Freestyle skiing

Olympic results

References 

1989 births
Living people
Bulgarian male alpine skiers
Alpine skiers at the 2014 Winter Olympics
Olympic alpine skiers of Bulgaria
Sportspeople from Varna, Bulgaria